Anxiang is a township of Xingtang County, Hebei, China.

Between 1161−1187 AD, the Hong Yan Temple was built here, later changed to the Temple of Xi'an Hong.

Economy
In 1954, primary agricultural production cooperatives were established, and developed into advanced agricultural producers' cooperatives in 1956. The township is agricultural based with 53,200 acres of arable land, the main crops being red sage root, Atractylodes, Chinese yam, Campanulaceae, astragalus, etc., with an annual output of 900 tons. Aquaculture has developed rapidly and the township has two large dairy farms. However, at the last census, 496 business enterprises were recorded in the township, industries such as plywood, machinery, nutritional supplements, aside from chicken and cattle farming.

Administrative divisions
The township contains the following villages:

Xi'anxiang Village	
Dong'anxiang Village 	
Biwei Village 	
Beixieshen Village	
Dongzheng Village 	
Dongzhengzhuang Village 	
Yuehuokou Village 	
Zhanghuokou Village 	
Mihuokou Village	() 	
Hujiazhuang Village 	
Dongliuying Village 	
Xiliuying Village 	
Dongfuliu Village	() 	
Nanfuliu Village 	
Xifuliu Village 	
Beifuliu Village 	
Zhongfuliu Village 	
Nanzhangwu Village 	
Beizhangwu Village 	
Changxiang Village	
Cihezhuang Village 	
Xizheng Village

See also
List of township-level divisions of Hebei

References

Township-level divisions of Hebei